Changgou Town is a town in the southern side of Fangshan District, Beijing, China. It is bordering Hangcunhe Town to its north, Baichigan Township to its east and south, and Dashiwo Town to its west. In 2020 it had 22,002 inhabitants within its borders.

History

Administrative divisions 
In 2021, Changgou Town had direct jurisdiction over 20 subdivisions, which were 2 communities and 18 villages:

See also 
 List of township-level divisions of Beijing

References 

Fangshan District
Towns in Beijing